Francisco Ocampo, O.S. (died 20 January 1684) was a Roman Catholic prelate who served as Titular Bishop of Amyclae (1660–1684).

Biography
On 21 June 1660, Francisco Ocampo was appointed during the papacy of Pope Alexander VII as Titular Bishop of Amyclae.
On 3 October 1660, he was consecrated bishop by Miguel Pérez Cevallos, Titular Bishop of Arcadiopolis in Asia. 
He served as Titular Bishop of Amyclae until his death on 20 January 1684.

Episcopal succession

References 

17th-century Roman Catholic titular bishops
Bishops appointed by Pope Alexander VII
1684 deaths